Adam Fernando Bareiro Gamarra (born 26 July 1996) is a Paraguayan footballer who plays as a forward for San Lorenzo, on loan from Monterrey.

Honours
Monterrey
CONCACAF Champions League: 2019

References

External links
 
 
 
 
 

1997 births
Living people
Paraguayan footballers
Paraguayan expatriate footballers
Sportspeople from Asunción
Association football forwards
Paraguayan Primera División players
Liga MX players
Argentine Primera División players
Club Olimpia footballers
Club Nacional footballers
C.F. Monterrey players
San Lorenzo de Almagro footballers
Expatriate footballers in Mexico
Paraguayan expatriate sportspeople in Mexico
Expatriate footballers in Argentina
Paraguayan expatriate sportspeople in Argentina